Ala-Buka is a district of Jalal-Abad Region in western Kyrgyzstan. The seat lies at Ala-Buka.

Population

Populated places
In total, Ala-Buka District comprised 41 villages in 8 rural communities. Each rural community can consist of one or several villages. The rural communities and settlements in the Ala-Buka District are:

 Ak-Korgon (seat: Ak-Korgon; incl. Safedbulan, Padek and Bayastan)
 Ak-Tam (seat: Ak-Tam; incl. Japa-Saldy and Kyzyl-Ata)
 Ala-Buka (seat: Ala-Buka; incl. Dostuk, Sapalak and Sary-Talaa)
 Birinchi May (seat: Ayry-Tam; incl. Ak-Bashat, Alma-Bel, Jangy-Shaar, Kara-Üngkür, Ajek and Sovet-Say)
 Kök-Serek (seat: Tenggi; incl. Ak-Taylak, Birleshken, Kosh-Bolot, Sary-Kol and Tölökö)
 Kök-Tash (seat: Kök-Tash; incl. Bulak-Bashy, Jalgyz-Örük, Külpök-Say, Orto-Suu and Chong-Say)
 Örüktü (seat: Örüktü; incl. Kengkol, Orto-Tokoy, Örüktü-Say and Cholok-Tuma)
 Törögeldi Baltagulov (seat: Yzar; incl. Baymak, Kashkalak, Kelte, Kosh-Almurut, Kosh-Terek and Kajar)

References 

Districts of Jalal-Abad Region